Roxburgh and Berwickshire  may refer to:
 Roxburgh and Berwickshire (Scottish Parliament constituency)
 Roxburgh and Berwickshire (UK Parliament constituency)